George Wolfe (16 December 1859 – 1 December 1941) was an Irish Cumann na nGaedheal politician, soldier, landowner, antiquarian, and farmer. He served for nine years as a Teachta Dála (TD) for the Kildare constituency.

Early and personal life
George Wolfe was born 16 December 1859 at Bishopland, Ballymore Eustace, County Kildare, the younger son among two sons and one daughter of Theobald George Samuel Wolfe (1815–1872), landowner, of Bishopland and Forenaghts, Naas, County Kildare, and his wife Elizabeth Wolfe (née Ball) In 1870, his father had inherited the extensive Forenaghts estate. 

Wolfe was educated at Rathmines School, Dublin; Trinity College Dublin; and the Royal Military College, Sandhurst. He succeeded as head of the family at Forenaghts on the death of his elder brother, Richard Wolfe in 1885.

In 1888, he married Emily Leeman (née Smethurst) (d. 1910), only child of Richard Smethurst of Elterbeck Hall, Chorley, Lancashire, and widow of Joseph Johnson Leeman, MP for York. They had one daughter.

Army career
In 1882, he was commissioned lieutenant in the Royal Irish Fusiliers, and  served at the Battle of Tell El Kebir in the Anglo-Egyptian War (being awarded a medal with clasp and the Khedive's Star), and in the 1884–1885 Sudanese war. After service with the 8th King's Royal Irish Hussars (1885–1890), he retired from the army with the rank of major.

Political career
Wolfe was served on Kildare County Council from 1899 to 1920; and was its vice-chairman from 1911 to 1920. He was elected to Dáil Éireann on his first attempt, at the 1923 general election, becoming the only Cumann na nGaedheal TD from the 3-seat Kildare constituency in the 4th Dáil. He was re-elected at the June 1927 general election and again at the September 1927 general election, but did not stand at the 1932 general election.

References

External links

1859 births
1941 deaths
Cumann na nGaedheal TDs
Irish farmers
Members of the 4th Dáil
Members of the 5th Dáil
Members of the 6th Dáil
High Sheriffs of Kildare
Local councillors in County Kildare
Irish justices of the peace
Alumni of Trinity College Dublin
Graduates of the Royal Military College, Sandhurst
Royal Irish Fusiliers officers
8th King's Royal Irish Hussars officers
British Army personnel of the Anglo-Egyptian War
People educated at Rathmines School